Jeżewo may refer to the following places:
Jeżewo, Świecie County in Kuyavian-Pomeranian Voivodeship (north-central Poland)
Jeżewo, Żnin County in Kuyavian-Pomeranian Voivodeship (north-central Poland)
Jeżewo, Łódź Voivodeship (central Poland)
Jeżewo, Płock County in Masovian Voivodeship (east-central Poland)
Jeżewo, Płońsk County in Masovian Voivodeship (east-central Poland)
Jeżewo, Pułtusk County in Masovian Voivodeship (east-central Poland)
Jeżewo, Sierpc County in Masovian Voivodeship (east-central Poland)
Jeżewo, Pomeranian Voivodeship (north Poland)
Jeżewo, Warmian-Masurian Voivodeship (north Poland)
Jeżewo, West Pomeranian Voivodeship (north-west Poland)